Narrows Bridge may refer to:

 Narrows Bridge (Perth), Western Australia
 Narrows Bridge (Indiana), USA
 Narrows Bridge (Pennsylvania), USA, listed on the National Register of Historic Places as Bridge in Snake Spring Township
 Narrows Bridge, Tamahere, New Zealand – heritage-registered bridge on State Highway 21

See also
 Tacoma Narrows Bridge, pair of suspension bridges in Tacoma, Washington, USA
 Tacoma Narrows Bridge (1940), the first suspension bridge in Tacoma, Washington, USA, whose collapse was caught on film in 1940
 Verrazzano-Narrows Bridge, in New York City